Bad Boy may refer to:

Books 
 Bad Boy (novel), a 2011 novel by Peter Robinson
 Bad Boy (1953 book), a 1953 autobiography by Jim Thompson
 Bad Boy (comics), a 1997 one-shot comic book by Frank Miller and Simon Bisley

Film and television 
 The Bad Boy (film), a 1917 American crime drama by Chester Withey
 Bad Boy (1935 film), an American film directed by John G. Blystone
 Bad Boy (1939 film), an American film directed by Herbert E. Meyer
 Bad Boy (1949 film), an American film starring Audie Murphy
 Bad Boy (1963 film) or The Bastard, a 1963 Japanese youth film directed by Seijun Suzuki
 Bad Boy (2002 film) or Dawg, a dramedy starring Denis Leary and Elizabeth Hurley
 "Bad Boy" (Kim Possible), an episode of Kim Possible
 Bad Guy (TV series) or Bad Boy, a 2010 Korean TV drama starring Kim Nam Gil and Han Ga In

Music

Albums 
 Bad Boy (G. Dep and Loon album), 2007
 Bad Boy (Ringo Starr album), 1978
 The Bad Boy (album), a 2006 album by Héctor "El Father"
 Bad Boy: The Concert, a 2007 live album by Héctor "El Father"
 Bad Boy, a 1980 album by Robert Gordon

Songs 
 "Bad Boy" (The Adicts song), 1983
 "Bad Boy" (Big Bang song), 2012
 "Bad Boy" (Chungha and Christopher song), 2020
 "Bad Boy" (Hadise song), 2006
 "Bad Boy" (The Jive Bombers song), 1957
 "Bad Boy" (Juice Wrld and Young Thug song), 2021 
 "Bad Boy" (Larry Williams song), 1959; covered by the Beatles, 1965
"Bad Boy" (Marty Wilde song), 1959
 "Bad Boy" (Miami Sound Machine song), 1986
 "Bad Boy" (Red Velvet song), 2018
 "Bad Boy" (Skepta song), 2010
 "Bad Boy/Having a Party", by Luther Vandross, 1982
 "Bad Boy", by Alexia from The Party, 1998
 "Bad Boy", by Carys, 2019
 "Bad Boy", by Cascada from Everytime We Touch, 2007
 "Bad Boy", by Đông Nhi, 2014
 "Bad Boy", by Fally Ipupa, 2017
 "Bad Boy", by Keke Wyatt from Soul Sista, 2001
 "Bad Boy", by Keshia Chanté from Keshia Chanté, 2004
 "Bad Boy", by Mary Wells from Bye Bye Baby I Don't Want to Take a Chance, 1961
 "Bad Boy", by Quiet Riot from Condition Critical, 1984
 "Bad Boy", by Ray Parker, Jr. from The Other Woman, 1982
 "Bad Boy", by Royce da 5'9" from Street Hop, 2009

Other uses in music
 Bad Boy Records, a record label founded by Sean "Diddy" Combs
 Bad Boy (band), an American rock band

Other uses 

 Bad boy clause, a provision within a contract which proscribes certain behavior
 Bad Boy (brand), a clothing and apparel brand
 Bad Boy (Gobots), a fictional character
 Lastman's Bad Boy Furniture, a Canadian furniture chain founded by Mel Lastman
 Bad boy archetype, a male who behaves badly within societal norms yet is attractive to women

See also 
 Peck's Bad Boy, a film based on a series of books by George W. Peck
 Bad Boys (disambiguation)
 Bad Girl (disambiguation)